Hyeonjong of Joseon (14 March 1641 – 17 September 1674) was the 18th king of the Joseon dynasty of Korea, reigning from 1659 to 1674. His reign was mostly marked by heavy conflict among the nation's political factions on various issues, particularly on funeral rites.

Biography

Background
Hyeonjong was born in 1641 as the first son of King Hyojong as Yi Yeon, while his father was still in China as a captive of the Qing dynasty; thus he was born at Shenyang before the Qing dynasty officially moved its capital to Beijing after defeating Ming dynasty in 1644. He returned to Korea in 1645 along with his father and became Crown Prince in 1651.

Conflict About Hyojong's Funeral (Yesong Controversy)
When King Hyojong died in 1659, Hyeonjong succeeded his father as the ruler of Joseon. The first issue during his reign was about his predecessor's funeral; The conservative Westerners faction and the liberal Southerners faction squared off about how long Queen Jangryeol, King Injo's second wife, should have to wear funeral garment according to the Confucian form of funeral. The Westerners, headed by Song Si-yeol, contended that she needed to wear the funeral garment for only a year, while the Southerners and their leader Heo Jeok wanted a 3-year period. This conflict arose because there was no previous record about Confucian funeral requirements when somebody's second stepson who actually succeeded the family line dies. The Westerners wanted to follow the custom for a second stepson, while the Southerners thought Hyojong deserved a 3-year funeral since he actually succeeded King Injo in the royal line.

The final decision was up to young King Hyeonjong; He chose to enforce a 1-year period, which would keep the Westerners as the major faction. However, at the same time, Hyeonjong did not remove Heo Jeok from office of Prime Minister, in order to prevent the Westerners from threatening royal authority. The feud between the Southerners and the Westerners was highly intensified by the funeral issue; Earlier, after the fall of the Greater Northerners in 1623, the Westerners and the Southerners formed political alliance under the leadership of King Hyojong, but on the funeral issue, both sides were intractable, leading to a greater probability of confrontations.

Hyeonjong at first maintained the balance of two factions by compromising between them with the 1-year period of the Westerners and keeping Southerner Heo Jeok as Prime Minister, and the two factions resumed a peaceful relationship temporarily. However, in 1674, when Queen Inseon, Hyojong's wife and Hyeonjong's mother, died, the funeral issue came up again; The Southerners wanted Queen Jaeui to wear the funeral garment for one year while the Westerners preferred a nine-month period. This time Hyeonjong listened to the Southerners and selected their method, making the Southerners faction as major political faction over the Westerners. The funeral controversy continued even after Hyeonjong died in 1675, and it was settled by Hyeonjong's successor King Sukjong, who banned all debate about the issue. The controversy even affected the publishing of official history of Hyeonjong's era; at first it was written chiefly by Southerners but later it was revised by Westerner historians.

Achievements
In 1666, during Hyeonjong's reign, Dutchman Hendrick Hamel left Korea after more than thirteen years of captivity. He returned to the Netherlands, where he wrote a book about Joseon Dynasty and his experience in Korea, which introduced the kingdom to many Europeans.

Hyeonjong stopped Hyojong's insuperable plan of northern conquest since Joseon had become a tributary state of the Qing Dynasty. Furthermore, after a series of victories against the Ming Dynasty, the Qing Dynasty had become too mighty to resist. However, Hyeonjong continued Hyojong's military expansion and reconstruction of the nation, devastated by the Seven-Year War and two Manchu invasions. He also encouraged astronomy and printing. He also legally banned the marriage between relatives and those who share the same surnames. He died in 1674, and his son Sukjong succeeded him.

Family
Father: King Hyojong of Joseon (3 July 1619 – 23 June 1659) (조선 효종).
Grandfather: King Injo of Joseon (7 December 1595 – 17 June 1649) (조선 인조).
Grandmother: Queen Inryeol of the Cheongju Han clan (16 August 1594 – 16 January 1636) (인렬왕후 한씨).
Mother: Queen Inseon of the Deoksu Jang clan (9 February 1619 – 19 March 1674) (인선왕후 장씨).
Grandfather: Jang Yu (1587 – 1638) (장유).
Grandmother: Lady Kim of the Andong Kim clan (안동 김씨).
Consort and respective issues:
Queen Myeongseong of the Cheongpung Kim clan (13 June 1642 – 21 January 1684) (명성왕후 김씨).
First Daughter (1658 – 1658)
 Princess Myeongseon (1660 – 2 August 1673) (명선공주), second daughter
 Crown Prince Yi Sun (7 October 1661 – 12 July 1720) (왕세자 이순), first son
 Princess Myeonghye (1665 – 27 April 1673) (명혜공주), third daughter
 Yi On-hui, Princess Myeongan (1667 – 16 May 1687) (이온희 명안공주), fourth daughter

Modern depictions in popular culture
Portrayed by Seo Young-jin in the 1981 KBS1 TV Series Daemyeong.
 Portrayed by Han Sang-jin in the 2012 MBC TV series The King's Doctor.
 Portrayed by Jeon In-taek in the 2013 SBS TV series Jang Ok-jung, Living by Love.

See also
Rulers of Korea.
History of Korea.
Joseon Dynasty.

References
Notes

Sources
 

1641 births
1674 deaths
17th-century Korean monarchs
People from Shenyang